Maayi is a 2000 Indian Tamil-language drama-film starring Sarath Kumar and Meena, wherein Vadivelu's comedy performance was critically acclaimed. The film was a super hit at box office.  
This film later remade into Telugu as Simharasi with Rajasekhar and Sakshi Sivanand in the year 2001 and in Kannada as Narasimha with Ravichandran in 2012.
The movie song 'Megham Udaithu' was shot in Mysore Lalitha Mahal.

Plot
Maayi is a well-respected, do-gooder in a village. He considers women in the village as his sisters and even helps financially  to conduct their weddings. He is a man who is ready to kill his father Irulandi when he learns that he had a second wife. But the father opts to kill himself rather than face his son and so, Maayi brings his half-sister Lakshmi to live with him. A local MLA comes to Maayi to get his support during the upcoming election, but he refuses and the MLA loses the election. But his son, who admires Maayi, marries Lakshmi.

Meanwhile, Bhuvaneswari, Maayi's distant relative's daughter comes to the village from Bangalore and she initially misunderstands Maayi by seeing his looks but later realizes her mistake after knowing about Maayi's hard work and his help towards improving the village. Maayi has built free hospital, day care center, college etc. to help the villagers. Bhuvaneshwari is attracted towards Maayi and proposes him but Maayi does not accept her love. But Bhuvana remains confident about marrying Maayi following which he tells his flashback. Maayi was born into a very poor family where his mother was infected by leprosy even before Maayi's birth. Due to poor financial condition, his mother could not be treated in hospital and instead was kept alone in a room. She was not allowed to touch her son Maayi fearing chances of the disease being spread. Maayi has never seen his mother right from his childhood as she always stays in a closed room. When Maayi was 8 years old, his mother gets frustrated more as her disease prevents her to show her affection towards Maayi and she commits suicide by drowning in a river. This shocks Maayi and he decides not to marry any woman as he does not want any girl to touch his body which was even untouched by his beloved mother.

Maayi convinces Bhuvaneshwari to marry someone else. Also, Maayi learns that his half-sister Lakshmi is being tortured by her husband and it was all a plan to take revenge on Maayi for not supporting the local MLA during elections. Maayi beats up Lakshmi's husband and says that he will never support criminal activities even if it impacts his family. On the day of Bhuvaneshwari's wedding, the bride groom's family misunderstands that Maayi and Bhuvaneshwari are lovers seeing Maayi's dhoti in her room and stops the marriage. Bhuvaneshwari's friend discloses the truth that Maayi gave his dhoti to safeguard her when her dresses were washed away in water sometime back. Manorama who also belongs the village shouts at the groom's family for their cruel thoughts and she requests Maayi to marry Bhuvaneshwari as that would be the right thing. Maayi obeys Manorama's words as his mother's and marries Bhuvaneshwari.

Cast

 Sarathkumar as Maayaandi as Maayi
 Meena as Bhuvaneswari
 Vadivelu as Mokkaisamy
 Vijayakumar as Father of Maayi (Irulandi)
 Sabitha Anand as Mother of Maayi (Nachiyamma)
 Anand as MLA's Son
 Rajan P. Dev as MLA Sundarapandiyan
 Suvalakshmi as Lakshmi
 Sathyapriya as Mother of Bhuvaneshwari
 Manorama as Foster mother of Maayi
 Manivannan as Uncle of Maayi
 Kovai Sarala as Rakayi
 Kaka Radhakrishnan as Thaathaa
 Deepa as Minnal
 Thiyagu as MLA Assistant 
 Dharini
 Nambirajan
 Bayilvaan Ranganathan
 Pasi Sathya
 Singamuthu
 Muthukaalai
 Ponnambalam as Police Officer
 Indhu 
 Bava Lakshmanan as Minnal's father
 Mahendran as Young Maayaandi 
 Raasi as Special Appearance
 Riyaz Khan as Marriage guest (uncredited)

Remakes

Soundtrack
Soundtrack was composed by S. A. Rajkumar.

References

2000 films
Tamil films remade in other languages
2000s Tamil-language films
Super Good Films films